Maurice Tourneux (12 July 184913 January 1917) was a French man of letters and bibliographer.

Life
The son of the artist and author J.F.E. Tourneux, he was born in Paris.

He began his career as a bibliographer by collaborating in new editions of the Supercheries littéraires of Joseph Quérard and the Dictionnaire des anonymes of Antoine Barbier. His most important bibliographical work was the Bibliographie de l'histoire de Paris pendant la Révolution française (3 vols. 1890-1901), which was crowned by the Academy of Inscriptions. This valuable work serves as a guide for the history of the city beyond the limits of the Revolution.

His other works include bibliographies of Prosper Mérimée (1876), of Théophile Gautier (1876), of the brothers de Goncourt (1897) and others; also editions of FM Grimm's , of Diderot's Neveu de Rameau (1884), of Montesquieu's Lettres persanes (Persian Letters, 1886), etc.

References

Attribution:

External links 
 
 
 Maurice Tounreux on data.bnf.fr

Writers from Paris
1849 births
1917 deaths
Lycée Louis-le-Grand alumni
French bibliographers
19th-century French historians
20th-century French historians
Denis Diderot
French male writers
19th-century male writers